This is a list of neo-psychedelia artists. Individuals are alphabetized by surname.

A–M

 Animal Collective
 The Apples In Stereo
 Apollo Sunshine
 Arctic Monkeys
 The Bevis Frond 
 Beck
 Blind Melon
 The Black Angels
 The Brian Jonestown Massacre
 The Church
  Crumb
 Dead Meadow
 Dr. Dog
 Djo
 The Dream Syndicate
 Echo & the Bunnymen
 Empire of the Sun
 Fever the Ghost
 Foster the People
 The Flaming Lips
 Grizzly Bear
 Gorky's Zygotic Mynci
 Guardian Alien
 Jane's Addiction
 Robyn Hitchcock
 Kasabian
 Keane
 Kid Cudi
 Khruangbin
 King Gizzard & the Lizard Wizard
 Kula Shaker
 Mazzy Star
 Melody's Echo Chamber
 Mercury Rev
 MGMT
Moon Duo
 My Morning Jacket

N–Z

 The Olivia Tremor Control
 Oh Sees
 Oasis
 OOIOO
 Phish
 Plasticland
 Primal Scream
 Pond
 Psychedelic Porn Crumpets
 Quest for Fire
 Raccoo-oo-oon
 Radio Moscow
 Screaming Trees
 The Stone Roses
 The Soft Boys
 The Soundtrack of Our Lives
 Spacemen 3
 Sparklehorse
 Spindrift
 Stardeath and White Dwarfs
 Stone Temple Pilots
 SubArachnoid Space
 Super Furry Animals
 Suuns
 Tame Impala
 Temples
 Teardrop Explodes
 Tripping Daisy
 Unknown Mortal Orchestra
 The Verve
 Vinyl Williams
 Warpaint
 Whitey (Musician)
 Will Z.
 Wooden Shjips
 Woods

See also
 List of dream pop artists
 List of shoegazing musicians

References

 
Neo-psychedelic